The Smash Hits Poll Winners Party was a British awards ceremony which ran from 1979 (as the Smash Hits Readers' Poll) to 2005. Each award winner was voted by readers of the Smash Hits magazine. It ended with the closure of the magazine in February 2006. The event was initially produced by Harvey Goldsmith and Janet Street-Porter. Tim Byrne also worked on the show. He now works alongside Simon Cowell.

When it moved to television, the awards ceremony was shown on BBC1 from 1988 to 2000 then later on Channel 4 from 2001 to 2005. During 2004 and 2005, it was renamed T4 Smash Hits Poll Winners Party. Past presenters have included Phillip Schofield, Simon Mayo, Andi Peters, Toby Anstis, Lily Savage, Ant and Dec, Will Smith, Melanie Sykes, June Sarpong and Vernon Kay. Past group winners have included Bros, New Kids on the Block, Take That, Spice Girls, Backstreet Boys, Boyzone, Westlife, Busted and Girls Aloud.

The event was notorious for the incident in 1991 involving Phillip Schofield and Carter USM, when the band's performance was cut short, causing them to trash up the stage. Following this, when Schofield made a remark about the band's behaviour, their guitarist Les "Fruitbat" Carter rugby tackled Schofield. The band was temporarily banned from performing on television, but ticket sales for its tour soared. The award itself was seen as a gimmicky object by many outside the magazine's readership, including winners such as rock bands (who only ever won their own genre-based category "Best Rock", although Coldplay were once nominated for Best Band). It was an oversized fake gold disc bearing the magazine's logo, turned slightly by 45 degrees to the left and placed in a black stand.

The ceremony was publicised by Anita Strymowicz for several years. The Smash Hits Poll Winners Party Party, a post-show bash gained almost as much coverage as the event itself with most of the artists and bands attending.

History
Smash Hits started to run its annual Poll Winners Poll in 1980. It involved asking their readers to complete a form that was printed in the magazine. The form detailed, among other things The Best Dressed Person and Favourite Single from the year, and the readers would send them into the Smash Hits offices. The completed forms would then be compiled into a list of the winners and runner up's and Smash Hits would then print them in the magazine. For the first couple of years the results were printed in either February or March of the next year. However, in 1982 the results were printed in December of the same year.

In 1988 the poll changed from just being published in the Magazine to being a TV Event and was renamed the Smash Hits Poll Winners Party. The awards ceremony ran from 1988 to 2005 and was still voted for by the readers of the magazine. The Smash Hits Poll Winners Party ended with the closure of the magazine in 2006. The event was initially produced by concert promoter, Harvey Goldsmith and Janet Street-Porter. Steps manager Tim Byrne, also worked on the show.

The awards ceremony was shown on BBC1 from 1988 to 2000 then later on Channel 4 from 2001 to 2005. During the 2004 and 2005 editions, it was renamed to T4 Smash Hits Poll Winners Party. Past presenters have included Phillip Schofield, Simon Mayo, Andi Peters, Toby Anstis, Lily Savage, Ant and Dec, Will Smith, Melanie Sykes, June Sarpong, and Vernon Kay.

The award itself was seen as a gimmicky object by many outside the magazine readership, including winners such as rock bands (who only were eligible to win "Best Rock"). It was an oversized fake gold disc bearing the magazine's logo, turned slightly by 45 degrees to the left placed in a black stand.

Awards

Readers' Poll

Winners Party
The Smash Hits Poll Winners Party is an annual awards show that was aired on BBC1 from 1988 to 2000 before moving to Channel 4 in 2001 until its demise in 2005 (T4 in 2004 and 2005).

Special awards

Hall of Fame
 2003: Westlife
 2004: Kylie Minogue
 2005: Britney Spears

Most wins
The following artists have won 10 or more awards.

References

Magazines about the media
Awards established in 1988
Awards disestablished in 2005
Award ceremonies in the United Kingdom
BBC Television shows
Channel 4 original programming